North Berne is an unincorporated community in Fairfield County, in the U.S. state of Ohio.

History
A post office was in operation at North Berne between 1856 and 1921. The community derives its name from Berne, in Switzerland, the native land of a large share of the early settlers.

References

Unincorporated communities in Fairfield County, Ohio
Unincorporated communities in Ohio